Han Jun may refer to：
 Han Jun (politician) (born 1963), Chinese male politician
 Han Jun (track cyclist) (born 1990), Chinese female track cyclist